Frans Nielsen (born 24 April 1984) is a Danish former professional ice hockey Forward who played with the New York Islanders and Detroit Red Wings in the National Hockey League (NHL). Nielsen was the first Danish citizen to play in the NHL.

Playing career
Nielsen was drafted by the New York Islanders in the third round, 87th overall in the 2002 NHL Entry Draft. After playing in the Swedish Elitserien since 2001, Nielsen signed a two-year contract with the New York Islanders on 15 May 2006. He has also played for the Danish national team.

With over 216 games in the Elitserien, Nielsen recorded 25 goals and 34 assists for 59 points and 66 penalty minutes.

Nielsen started the 2006–07 AHL season with the Islanders' affiliate, the Bridgeport Sound Tigers, and was recalled to the Islanders on 5 January 2007. He made his NHL debut on 6 January. At the time of his recall, he had recorded a point in nine consecutive American Hockey League (AHL) games, which was three games shy of the Sound Tigers' club record.

During the 2010–11 NHL season, Nielsen scored a league-leading seven short-handed goals, including two penalty shot goals in three-on-five shorthanded situations. Near the end of the 2010–11 NHL season, Islanders' Captain Doug Weight was quoted as saying of Nielsen, "He’s our best all-around player even though his stats don’t necessarily show it". On 7 February 2012, Nielsen signed a four-year, $11 million contract with the Islanders.

Nielsen holds the distinction of being the most successful NHL player of all time in shootouts (i.e., scoring percentage among players with a substantial number of shootout attempts). He even scored a goal in a shootout before being credited with his first official NHL goal. His signature move in the competition has been dubbed the "Danish Backhand of Judgement", though he has also scored using his forehand. He ended his NHL career with a success rate of 46.23% (49 goals from 106 attempts).

On 25 October 2014, he recorded his first career NHL hat trick against Anders Lindbäck of the Dallas Stars by scoring all three goals in the third period.

On 1 July 2016, Nielsen signed as a free agent to a six-year, $31.5 million contract with the Detroit Red Wings, marking the end of his 10-year tenure with the Islanders. During the 2016–17 season Nielsen was selected to participate in the 2017 NHL All-Star Game.

In the following 2017–18 season, Nielsen scored his 47th shootout goal, making him the all-time leader in shootout goals. The goal came against the New York Rangers in a 3–2 win on 29 December 2017.

At the conclusion of the  season with the rebuilding Red Wings, having regressed offensively by adding just 1 goal and 6 points through 29 regular season games, Nielsen was bought-out from the remaining year of his $5.25 million annual salary on 19 August 2021, releasing him as a free agent.

Un-signed leading into the  season, Nielsen signaled the conclusion of his NHL career by returning to Europe and agreeing to a one-year contract with German club, Eisbären Berlin of the Deutsche Eishockey Liga (DEL), on 10 October 2021. In his last professional season, Nielsen was instrumental in providing veteran leadership to Berlin, posting 12 goals and 27 points through 33 regular season games. He added 7 points in 12 playoff games to help Eisbären Berlin defend and claim the DEL championship.

International play

Nielsen represented Denmark fourteen times at the senior level. In 2002, he made his senior debut when Denmark was promoted to the IIHF elite division.

Nielsen represented Team Europe at the 2016 World Cup of Hockey, where he recorded two assists in six games and won a silver medal.

Nielsen was part of the Danish roster to qualify for their first Olympic appearance in 2022 in Beijing, China. During the 2022 Winter Olympics opening ceremony, Nielsen, along with curler Madeleine Dupont, served as flag bearers for Denmark. Nielsen appeared in all five games at the tournament, posting two goals and 3 points in a 7th place finish for Denmark.

Nielsen retired from professional ice hockey after the Danish elimination from the 2022 IIHF World Championship, following a 1-7 defeat to Slovakia. In the tournament, Danes were eliminated despite collecting historic 12 points in the group stage.

Career statistics

Regular season and playoffs

International

Awards and honours

References

External links

 

1984 births
Bridgeport Sound Tigers players
Danish ice hockey centres
Eisbären Berlin players
Herning Blue Fox players
Living people
Lukko players
Malmö Redhawks players
Detroit Red Wings players
National Hockey League All-Stars
New York Islanders draft picks
New York Islanders players
People from Herning Municipality
Timrå IK players
Ice hockey players at the 2022 Winter Olympics
Olympic ice hockey players of Denmark
Sportspeople from the Central Denmark Region